Jack Reed: Badge of Honor is a 1993 American made-for-television crime drama film written by Andrew Laskos, directed by Kevin Connor starring Brian Dennehy, Susan Ruttan, and Alice Krige. It was the sequel to the 1992 made-for-TV crime drama Deadly Matrimony, continuing the fictional Jack Reed character in a television film series.

Synopsis
Committed to find the killer of a mother, Sgt. Jack Reed (played by Brian Dennehy) finds a trail of lies, corruption and murder.

Cast
Brian Dennehy as Sergeant Jack Reed
Susan Ruttan as Arlene Reed
Alice Krige as Joan Anatole
R. D. Call as Lieutenant Lloyd Butler
Amy Aquino as Sharon Hilliard
Jo Anderson as Wendy Simmons 
Byron Minns
Neal McDonough		
Justin Burnette as John Reed Jr.
Michael Talbott as Eddie Dirkson
Joey Zimmerman	as Greg Travis
Michele Lamar Richards	as Molly
William Sadler as Anatole
Udo Kier as Giles Marquette
Amber Benson as Nicole Reed
Angela Alvarado as Marie Sanchez
Peter Crook as Ross Dunbar
Juanita Jennings as Dr. Laura Wheeler
Barbara Tarbuck as Dora Ferro
Bruce French as Senator Marik
Bill Bolender as Stan Howell
Alan Wilder as Billy
Kenneth Danziger as Dr. Ben Gregg
Shane Powers as Nick Marik
Robert Nadir as Forensic Technician
Maray Ayres as Ruthie Lambert
Alan Shearman as District Attorney
Chuck Hicks as Sergeant Hunter

Jack Reed series
Many sequels were also made with the main role to Brian Dennehy including:
Jack Reed: A Search for Justice (1994)
Jack Reed: One of Our Own (1995)
Jack Reed: A Killer Among Us (1996)
Jack Reed: Death and Vengeance (1996)

External links

1993 television films
1993 films
1993 crime drama films
American crime drama films
NBC network original films
Films directed by Kevin Connor
Films scored by Lee Holdridge
American drama television films
1990s American films
1990s English-language films